Indus University, formerly Indus Institute of Technology and Engineering is a private university established in 2006. In 2012, Indus received university status and is recognized by the University Grants Commission (UGC). Indus university is an All India Council for Technical Education  (AICTE) approved university. Indus University is located in Rancharda, Ahmedabad, Gujarat, India.

Indus University had a sign-up memorandum of understanding (MoU) with Dassault Systemes for a Collaborative Learning and Innovation Centre (CLIC) at the Indus campus. CLIC will allow students of Indus University to use Dassault Systemes V6 Technologies, along with LEGO Mindstorms and an Arduino micro-controller, to build cyber-physical projects that will answer problems through inter-disciplinary engineering and management approach.

Campus
The university campus is spread across  of land far from the clamor of the city, with separate hostel facilities for boys and girls, including international students. Indus provides limited accommodation for faculty members also. The campus has a football ground, volleyball court and basketball court.

Programmes

Undergraduate Programmes 

 Bachelor of Technology (B.Tech.) 
 Metallurgical Engineering
 Automobile Engineering
 Civil Engineering
 Mechanical Engineering
 Computer Engineering
 Computer Science and Engineering
 Information Technology
 Electronics and Communication
 Electrical Engineering
 Bachelor of Architecture (B.Arch.) 
 Bachelor of Science (Aircraft Maintenance)
Bachelor of Design (Industrial Design, Fashion Design, Communication Design)
Bachelors in Commerce (Honors)
Bachelors in Science (Chemistry)
Bachelors in Science (Physics)
Bachelors of Science (Mathematics)
Bachelors of Science (Clinical Research)

Postgraduate programmes 

 Master of Technology (M.Tech.)
 Industrial Metallurgy
 CAD/CAM
 Digital Communication
 Data sciences
 High performance computing
 Master of Computer Application (MCA)
 Master of Business Administration (MBA)
 Master of Science (IT) (M.Sc. IT)
Master of Science (Analytical Chemistry)
Master of Science(Organic Chemistry)
Master of Science(Clinical Research)
Master of Science(Physics)

5 Years Integrated Programmes 

 Dual Degree BBA + MBA
 Dual Degree B.Sc. + M.Sc. (CA & IT)
 Dual Degree BCA + MCA

4 Years Integrated Programme 

 Integrated MBA

Indus University is in partnership with the Indo-China Economic Council (ICEC) and will sign an MoU with Sias International University, the first American university in China. Indus will establish a Centre of Excellence for Innovation at Sias University.

Achievements 
Electrical and Electronics engineering student of Indus University has designed the system, that wouldn't let his bike;start till he wore the helmet.

References

External links
 Official website

Universities in Ahmedabad
Science education in India
Private universities in India
Business schools in Gujarat
2012 establishments in Gujarat
Educational institutions established in 2012